Radical 112 or radical stone meaning "stone" (石头) is one of the 23 Kangxi radicals (214 radicals in total) composed of 5 strokes.

In the Kangxi Dictionary, there are 499 characters (out of 49,030) to be found under this radical.

 is also the 102nd indexing component in the Table of Indexing Chinese Character Components predominantly adopted by Simplified Chinese dictionaries published in mainland China.

Evolution

Derived characters

Literature

External links

Unihan Database - U+77F3

112
102